Escacena del Campo is a town and municipality located in the province of Huelva, Spain. According to the 2005 census, the municipality has a population of 2,182 inhabitants.

References

External links
Escacena del Campo - Sistema de Información Multiterritorial de Andalucía

Municipalities in the Province of Huelva